(also spelled , and sometimes misspelled ) is a Confucian teaching that instructs people to eat until they are 80 percent full. Roughly, in English the Japanese phrase translates to, "Eat until you are eight parts (out of ten) full", or "belly 80 percent full".

Okinawans

As of the early 21st century, Okinawans in Japan continue practicing . They consume about 1,800 to 1,900 kilo-calories per day. Their elders' typical body mass index (BMI) is about 18 to 22, compared to a typical BMI of 26 or 27 for adults over 60 in the United States. Okinawa has the world's highest proportion of centenarians, at approximately 50 per 100,000 people.

Biochemist Clive McCay, a professor at Cornell University in the 1930s, reported that significant calorie restriction prolonged life in laboratory animals. Authors Bradley and Craig Wilcox and Makoto Suzuki believe that  may act as a form of calorie restriction, thus extending practitioners' life expectancy. They believe  assists in keeping the average Okinawan's BMI low, and this is thought to be due to the delay in the stomach stretch receptors that help signal satiety. The result of not practising  is a constant stretching of the stomach which in turn increases the amount of food needed to feel full.

In other cultures

China
The teaching is Confucian, a belief system dating back to the 5th century BCE. A similar saying to the Japanese one is found in Traditional Chinese Medicine:  ("only eat until you are 70 percent full.")

India
The principle also appears in Ayurvedic medicine, dating back to the 4th century BCE,  where "you should fill one third of the stomach with liquid, another third with food, and leave the rest empty."

Influence

Zen
In the 1965 book Three Pillars of Zen, the author quotes Hakuun Yasutani in his lecture for  beginners as telling his students about the book  (Precautions to Observe in ), written circa 1300, which advises practitioners to eat about two-thirds of their capacity. Yasutani advises his students to eat only eighty percent of their capacity, and he repeats a Japanese proverb: "eight parts of a full stomach sustain the man; the other two sustain the doctor".

American culture
 was popularized in the United States by a variety of modern books on diet and longevity.

See also
 Calorie restriction
 Mitahara
 Okinawa diet

References

Footnotes

Eating behaviors of humans
Diets
Gerontology
Japanese proverbs